Hanover Township is one of fourteen townships in Shelby County, Indiana. As of the 2010 census, its population was 2,283 and it contained 962 housing units.

Hanover Township was organized before 1840.

Geography

Cities and towns
 Morristown

Unincorporated towns
 Freeport
 Gwynneville

References

External links
 Indiana Township Association
 United Township Association of Indiana

Townships in Shelby County, Indiana
Townships in Indiana